Pranab Mukherjee  (11 December 1935 – 31 August 2020) was an Indian politician and statesman who served as the 13th president of India from 2012 until 2017. In a political career spanning five decades, Mukherjee was a senior leader in the Indian National Congress and occupied several ministerial portfolios in the Government of India. Prior to his election as President, Mukherjee was Union Finance Minister from 2009 to 2012. He was awarded India's highest civilian honour, the Bharat Ratna, in 2019, by his successor as president, Ram Nath Kovind.

Mukherjee got his break in politics in 1969 when the then Prime Minister Indira Gandhi helped him get elected to the Rajya Sabha, the upper house of Parliament of India, on a Congress ticket. Following a meteoric rise, he became one of Gandhi's most trusted lieutenants and a minister in her cabinet in 1973. Mukherjee's service in a number of ministerial capacities culminated in his first stint as Finance Minister of India in 1982–84. He was also the Leader of the House in the Rajya Sabha from 1980 to 1985.

Mukherjee was sidelined from Congress during the premiership of Rajiv Gandhi. Mukherjee had viewed himself and not the inexperienced Rajiv, as the rightful successor to Indira following her assassination in 1984. Mukherjee lost out in the ensuing power struggle. He formed his own party, the Rashtriya Samajwadi Congress, which merged with Congress in 1989 after reaching a consensus with Rajiv Gandhi. After Rajiv Gandhi's assassination in 1991, Mukherjee's political career was revived when Prime Minister P. V. Narasimha Rao appointed him Planning Commission head in 1991 and foreign minister in 1995. Following this, as an elder statesman of Congress, Mukherjee was the principal architect of Sonia Gandhi's ascent to the party's presidency in 1998.

When the Congress-led United Progressive Alliance (UPA) came to power in 2004, Mukherjee won a Lok Sabha (the popularly elected lower house of Parliament) seat for the first time. From then until his resignation in 2012, he held a number of key cabinet portfolios in Prime Minister Manmohan Singh's governmentDefence (2004–06), External Affairs (2006–09), and Finance (2009–12)apart from heading several Groups of Ministers (GoMs) and being Leader of the House in the Lok Sabha. After securing the UPA's nomination for the country's presidency in July 2012, Mukherjee comfortably defeated P. A. Sangma in the race to the Rashtrapati Bhavan (the Indian presidential residence), winning 70 percent of the electoral-college vote.

In 2017, Mukherjee decided not to run for re-election and to retire from politics after leaving the presidency due to "health complications relating to old age." His term expired on 25 July 2017. He was succeeded as President by Ram Nath Kovind. In June 2018, Mukherjee became the first former President of India to address a Rashtriya Swayamsevak Sangh (RSS) event.

Early life and education
Pranab Mukherjee was born on 11 December 1935 during the British Colonial rule, into a Bengali Brahmin family in Mirati, a village in the Bengal Presidency (now in Birbhum district, West Bengal). His father, Kamada Kinkar Mukherjee, was active participant in the Indian independence movement and was a member of the West Bengal Legislative Council between 1952 and 1964 as a representative of the Indian National Congress; he was also a member of AICC. His mother was Rajlakshmi Mukherjee. He had two siblings: older sister Annapurna Banarjee (1928–2020) and older brother Piyush Mukherjee (1931–2017).

Mukherjee attended Suri Vidyasagar College in Suri (Birbhum), which was then affiliated to the University of Calcutta. He subsequently earned an MA degree in political science and history and an LL.B. degree, both from the University of Calcutta

He was an upper-division Clerk in the Office of the Deputy Accountant-General (Post and Telegraph) in Calcutta. In 1963, he became a lecturer (Assistant Professor) of Political Science at Vidyanagar College, Kolkata, affiliated to the University of Calcutta and he also worked as a journalist at Desher Dak (Call of the Motherland) before entering politics. Mukherjee first ran for public office in 1969, when he won a seat in the Rajya Sabha (upper house) of the Indian parliament as a member of the Bangla Congress, which soon merged with the Congress Party. He served an additional four terms, although he left that chamber in 2004 and contested and won a seat in the Lok Sabha (lower house). He served there until mid-2012, when he ran for president of India.

Political career
Mukherjee started his political career in 1967 as a founding member of the Bangla Congress. Ahead of the 1967 election, he played a crucial role in forging the United Front alliance against the Indian National Congress. In 1969, he managed the successful Midnapore by-election campaign of an independent candidate, V. K. Krishna Menon. He became a member of the Rajya Sabha (the upper house of Indian parliament) in July 1969 on a Bangla Congress ticket. Mukherjee soon became the medium of exchanging confidential notes between Indira Gandhi and Ajoy Mukherjee. In 1972, Indira Gandhi recruited him to the Indian National Congress along with merging the Bangla Congress into the party. Mukherjee was re-elected to the house in 1975, 1981, 1993, and 1999.

He became a Gandhi loyalist and was often described as her "man for all seasons." Mukherjee's rise was rapid in the early phase of his career and he was appointed Union Deputy Minister of Industrial Development in Indira Gandhi's cabinet in 1973. He was active in the Indian cabinet during the controversial Internal Emergency of 1975–77. Ruling Congress politicians of the day including Mukherjee were accused of using extra-constitutional powers to "wreck established norms and rules of governance". Following Congress's defeat in the 1977 general elections, the newly formed Janata government-appointed Shah Commission indicted Mukherjee; however, the commission was itself indicted in 1979 for stepping "outside its jurisdiction". Mukherjee emerged unscathed and rose through a series of cabinet posts to become Finance Minister from 1982 to 1984.

His term was noted for his work in improving the finances of the government, which enabled Gandhi to score a political point by returning the last installment of India's first IMF loan. As Finance Minister, Mukherjee signed the letter appointing Manmohan Singh as Governor of the Reserve Bank of India.

In 1979, Mukherjee became Deputy Leader of the INC in the Rajya Sabha, and in 1980, he was appointed Leader of the House. He was considered the top-ranking Indian cabinet minister and he presided over cabinet meetings in the absence of the Prime Minister.

Mukherjee was sidelined from the INC following the assassination of Indira Gandhi. Although he was much more experienced in politics than Indira's son, Rajiv Gandhi, it was Rajiv who gained control. Mukherjee lost his position in the cabinet and was sent to manage the regional West Bengal Pradesh Congress Committee. He was considered to be Indira's likely successor and, siding with those within his party who aligned themselves against Rajiv Gandhi, Mukherjee was sidelined and eventually expelled from the mainstream.

In 1986, Mukherjee founded another party, the Rashtriya Samajwadi Congress (RSC), in West Bengal. The RSC and INC merged three years later after a compromise was reached with Rajiv Gandhi. The RSC had fared terribly in the 1987 Assembly polls in West Bengal. Many analysts, over the years, have attributed the muting of Mukherjee's political aspirations as the supreme leader to his inability to emerge as a magnetic mass leader. On later being asked whether he ever desired to become Prime Minister, Mukherjee replied, "7 RCR was never my destination." Zee News noted: "The statement assumes heft in the light of the longstanding speculation that Mukherjee, as one of the doyens of Congress, always nursed an ambition to occupy the top executive post".

Mukherjee's political career revived following the Assassination of Rajiv Gandhi in 1991, when P. V. Narasimha Rao chose to appoint him as deputy chairman of the Indian Planning Commission and subsequently as a union cabinet minister. He served as External Affairs Minister from 1995 to 1996 in Rao's cabinet.

Mukherjee was considered to be a Gandhi family loyalist and the principal architect of Sonia Gandhi's entry into politics, a mentoring responsibility he was believed to have continued shouldering. He was made General Secretary of the AICC in 1998–99 after Sonia Gandhi became Congress President. Mukherjee was made President of the West Bengal Congress in 2000 and held the position until his resignation in 2010. He had earlier held the position in 1985.

Mukherjee became Leader of the House in the Lok Sabha in 2004. He contested and won a Lok Sabha seat from Jangipur in West Bengal, which he would later retain in 2009. It was speculated in 2004 that Mukherjee would be made Prime Minister of India after Sonia Gandhi declined to become Prime Minister; however, Manmohan Singh was chosen instead.

Mukherjee was briefly considered for the post of the largely ceremonial Indian presidency in 2007, but his name was subsequently dropped after his contribution to the Union Cabinet was considered practically indispensable.

He held many important posts in the Manmohan Singh government: He had the distinction of being the minister for various high-profile ministries, including Defence, Finance, and External Affairs. Apart from being Leader of the House in the Lok Sabha and Bengal Pradesh Congress Committee President, he also headed the Congress Parliamentary Party and the Congress Legislative Party, which consist of all the Congress MP's and MLA's in the country.

Mukherjee ended his affiliation with the Indian National Congress and retired from active political life following his election as president in 2012. The Economic Times had noted: "[the] decades of activity in critical all-rounder roles make [Mukherjee's] exit both a structural and generation shift. With him, the last of the Congress triumviratealong with Rao and R. Venkataramanwho formed the core team of Indira/Rajiv regimes bows out. While Rao became PM, Pranab's political marathon too ends where Venkataraman's did, at the Rashtrapati Bhavan".

Political party role
Mukherjee was "very well respected within the party social circles". Media accounts describe him as having "a reputation as a number-crunching politician with a phenomenal memory and an unerring survival instinct".

He became a member of the Congress Working Committee on 27 January 1978. He also became a member of the Central Parliamentary Board of the All India Congress Committee (AICC) that year. Mukherjee briefly held the position of treasurer of the AICC and the Congress party in 1978.

He was appointed chairman of the Campaign Committee of the AICC for conducting National Elections to Parliament in 1984, 1991, 1996, and 1998. He was chairman of the Central Election Coordination Committee of the AICC from 28 June 1999 to 2012. He was appointed to the Central Election Committee on 12 December 2001. Mukherjee was appointed General Secretary of the AICC in 1998. In 1997, he was voted Outstanding Parliamentarian by the Indian Parliamentary Group.

After Sonia Gandhi reluctantly agreed to join politics, Mukherjee was one of her mentors, guiding her through difficult situations with examples of how her mother-in-law, Indira Gandhi, would have done things. His talents were on display during the negotiations for the Patents Amendment Bill in early 2005. Congress was committed to passing an IP bill, but their allies in the United Progressive Alliance from the Left front had a long tradition of opposing some of the monopoly aspects of intellectual property. Mukherjee, as Defence Minister, was not formally involved but was roped in for his negotiation skills. He drew on many old allies including the CPI-M leader Jyoti Basu (former Chief Minister of West Bengal), and formed new intermediary positions, which included product patents. Then, he had to convince his own colleagues, including commerce minister Kamal Nath, who at one point said..."An imperfect legislation is better than no legislation". Finally, on 23 March 2005, the bill was approved.

India Today wrote that Mukherjee's role in "skillfully pushing through the historic 123 Agreement and treaty with the Nuclear Suppliers Group" may have saved the UPA-II government from the 2008 motion of no confidence.

Mukherjee played a crucial role in steering the Cabinet pre-Lok Sabha elections when Prime Minister Manmohan Singh underwent a heart bypass surgery in 2008–09 by taking additional charges as chairman of the Cabinet Committee of Political Affairs and Union Minister in the Finance Ministry despite already being Union Minister of External Affairs.

Mukherjee's political skills and long experience in government have also led him to head a large number of committees of ministers in the government. At the time of his resignation, on being nominated as the UPA's presidential candidate, Mukherjee was heading several Groups of Ministers (GoMs) and Empowered Groups of Ministers (EGoMs).

Union Cabinet Minister

Minister of Defence

 
Manmohan Singh appointed Mukherjee as the Minister of Defence of India when the Congress Party once again came to power in 2004. Mukherjee held the post until 2006. He expanded cooperation with the United States during his tenure. The Times of India reported on the Wikileaks cables release and noted how the U.S. was full of praise for the "uniformed leadership" of Indian armed forces. In June 2005, Mukherjee inked the ten-year Indo-US Defence Framework deal.

Despite increasing co-operation with the United States, Mukherjee maintained that Russia would remain India's 'topmost' defence partner. He asserted that "Russia has been and will remain India's largest defence partner in the years to come" while inaugurating the 5th session of the Indo-Russian Inter-Governmental Commission on Military-Technical Cooperation (IRIGC-MTC) in Moscow in 2005.

Russia and India held their first joint anti-terror war games in Rajasthan in October 2005, during which Mukherjee and Russian Defence Minister Sergei Ivanov narrowly escaped injury after a heavy mortar landed several metres from their platform. The Russian ministry subsequently declared its hopes to follow up joint military exercises in India with further joint exercises on Russian territory.

Minister of External Affairs

Mukherjee was appointed External Affairs Minister of India in 1995. Under his leadership, India was made "Full Dialogue Partner" of ASEAN as part of the Look East foreign policy initiated by Narasimha Rao. Mukherjee left the position in 1996.

His second term began in 2006. He oversaw the successful signing of the U.S.-India Civil Nuclear Agreement with the U.S. government and then with the Nuclear Suppliers Group, allowing India to participate in civilian nuclear trade in spite of not having signed the Nuclear Non-Proliferation Treaty. Mukherjee played a crucial role in mobilising world opinion against Pakistan after the 2008 Mumbai attacks. He left the position a year later to take over the Finance Ministry of India.

When asked what legacy he wanted to leave behind as Foreign Minister of India, Mukherjee replied, "As the [man] who prepared Indian diplomacy to address the challenges of a more globalised, interdependent and uncertain world".

Minister of Commerce and Industry
Mukherjee thrice served as Commerce Minister of India. His first stints were in the Indira Gandhi government from 1980 to 1982 and again in 1984. His third stint in the 1990s saw him contribute significantly to the negotiations which led to the establishment of the World Trade Organization.

Minister of Finance

Mukherjee's first stint as the Finance Minister of India was during the Indira Gandhi government in 1982. He presented his first annual budget in 1982–83. His first term was noted for the work he did to improve the finances of the government and for successfully returning the last instalment of India's first 
IMF loan. Mukherjee signed the letter appointing Manmohan Singh as the Governor of the Reserve Bank of India in 1982. He was accused of patronage practices in the Ambani–Wadia industrial feuds.

Mukherjee was credited with being an early reformer of the Indian economy. India Today wrote: "Operation Forward, which [Mukherjee] and then Industries Minister Charanjit Chanana launched in the early 1980s, started the liberalisation process that flowered under Rao and Manmohan Singh". A Left-wing magazine once commented that "socialism did not grow out of the pipe Mukherjee smoked".

Mukherjee was removed from his position as Finance Minister by Rajiv Gandhi in 1984. Gandhi had wished to bring in his own team of staff to govern India. Mukherjee was replaced even though he was rated as the best Finance Minister in the World that year according to a survey by Euromoney magazine.

He returned to handling the finances of India during the premiership of Narasimha Rao, after being appointed Deputy Chairman of the Planning Commission. During Mukherjee's tenure of 1991 to 1996, Dr. Manmohan Singh as Finance Minister oversaw many economic reforms to end the Licence Raj system and help open the Indian economy.

Mukherjee once again became the Finance Minister of India in 2009. He presented the annual budgets in 2009, 2010, and 2011. The 2010–11 budget included the country's first explicit target to cut public debt as a proportion of the GDP and Mukherjee targeted a budget deficit reduction of 4.1% of the GDP in the fiscal year 2012–13, from 6.5% in 2008–09.

He implemented many tax reforms, including scrapping the Fringe Benefits Tax and the Commodities Transaction Tax. He implemented the Goods and Services Tax during his tenure. These reforms were well received by major corporate executives and economists. The introduction of retrospective taxation, however, has been criticised by some economists.

Mukherjee expanded funding for several social sector schemes including the Jawaharlal Nehru National Urban Renewal Mission. He also supported budget increases for improving literacy and health care. He expanded infrastructure programmes such as the National Highway Development Programme. Electricity coverage was also expanded during his tenure. Mukherjee also reaffirmed his commitment to the principle of fiscal prudence as some economists expressed concern about the rising fiscal deficits during his tenure, the highest since 1991. Mukherjee declared the expansion in government spending was only temporary.

In 2010, he was awarded "Finance Minister of the Year for Asia" by Emerging Markets, the daily newspaper of record for the World Bank and the International Monetary Fund (IMF). Mukherjee was praised for "the confidence [he] has inspired in key stakeholders, by virtue of his fuel price reforms, fiscal transparency and inclusive growth strategies". The Banker also recognised him as "Finance Minister of the Year."

Mukherjee's final years at the finance ministry were not considered a success. The NDTV, upon his resignation in June 2012, wrote: "There [had] been a clamour from many quarters for a change in the Finance Ministry, with Mr Mukherjee having faced flak for several decisions where politics seemed to overwhelm economic imperatives".

Other positions
Mukherjee was chairman of the Indian Statistical Institute in Kolkata. He also held the following posts: chairman and president of the Rabindra Bharati University and the Nikhil Bharat Banga Sahitya Sammelan; trustee of the Bangiya Sahitya Parishad and the Bidhan Memorial Trust. He also served on the Planning Board of the Asiatic Society.

Presidential election

Mukherjee was nominated as the presidential candidate of the United Progressive Alliance on 15 June 2012 after considerable political intrigue. The elections were scheduled to be conducted on 19 July 2012 and the results were expected to be announced on 22 July 2012.  The nominee of the National Democratic Alliance (NDA) was P. A. Sangma. To file his nomination for the presidential poll on 28 June, Mukherjee resigned from the government on 26 June 2012.

In the election, Mukherjee received 7,13,763 votes, while Sangma had 3,15,987. In his victory speech, delivered outside his residence before the results were officially announced, he said:

Mukherjee was sworn in by the Chief Justice of India on 25 July 2012, becoming the first Bengali to hold the post of President of India. After being administered the oath of office, he stated that we are in the midst of a fourth world war of terror (the third was the Cold war) and what minutes of peace can achieve cannot be achieved in many years of war.

Congress President Sonia Gandhi and Prime Minister Manmohan Singh both congratulated Mukherjee on his election as president. Former Communist leader Somnath Chatterjee termed Mukherjee as one of "the best parliamentarians and statesmen of India" and said the country "has got the most able man for the top job". Opposition leader Sharad Yadav declared "the nation needed a president like Pranab Mukherjee". Delhi Chief Minister Sheila Dikshit commented and said Mukherjee will be "one of the wisest presidents". She further marvelled at the fact that parties in the opposition ranks supported Mukherjee. "Even the NDA broke up and wanted to vote for the president to be Pranab Mukherjee". The Bharatiya Janata Party (BJP) was reportedly "shocked" and "upset" at the cross-voting for Mukherjee by its legislative members. However, BJP party president Nitin Gadkari congratulated Mukherjee and said "I extend my hearty congratulations to Pranab Mukherjee on his election today as the new President of India". Gadkari further declared "I am sure that the country will make further development and progress. I wish him all success and a bright future".

Zee News noted: "What is striking about [Mukherjee] is that after more than four decades in public life, the Opposition had no ammunition against him after he was declared UPA's choice for President. In spite of Team Anna making some noise about him being involved in some corruption cases, it has been more or less an easy ride for Pranab to Raisina Hill. Once when Sonia Gandhi announced his name, most of the allies and the Opposition came on board. Whereas, NDA partner JD(U) saw no merit in opposing him, one of the bitter critics of the Congress Shiv Sena too toed the line a little too easily. This support was not for Congress but for [Mukherjee]".

President of India
Criminal Law (Amendment) Ordinance, 2013 was promulgated by Pranab Mukherjee on 3February 2013, providing for the amendment of the Indian Penal Code, Indian Evidence Act, and the Code of Criminal Procedure, 1973 on laws related to sexual offences. As of July 2015, President Mukherjee had rejected 24 mercy pleas including those of Yakub Memon, Ajmal Kasab, and Afzal Guru. Pranab Mukherjee became first President of India to reply all the mercy petitions in his term for the death row inmates and also replying the petitions of former presidents.

In January 2017, Mukherjee announced that he would not contest the 2017 Presidential elections, citing "advanced age and failing health".

Personal life
Pranab Mukherjee married Suvra Mukherjee on 13 July 1957. Suvra Mukherjee was born at Narail, Bengal Presidency, Present Bangladesh. She moved to Kolkata while she was 10 and married Pranab in 1957. The couple had two sons and a daughter. Suvra died on 18 August 2015, aged 74, of heart failure, while Mukherjee was still in office. Their elder son, Abhijit Mukherjee, was a Congress MP from Jangipur, West Bengal, until 2019. He was elected in a by-election after his father vacated the seat. Before his election to the Lok Sabha, Abhijit was an MLA from Nalhati in Birbhum.

Mukherjee was inspired by Deng Xiaoping and quoted him quite frequently. His hobbies were reading, gardening, and music.

His daughter Sharmistha Mukherjee is a Kathak dancer and politician of the Indian National Congress.

Mukherjee celebrated the Durga Puja at his ancestral home in Mirati village. He used to make it a point to be at Mirati village every year to take part in the four-day rituals, the puja having a "social dimension" for him. "I want to avail this opportunity to be with the people of my area", Mukherjee said during a puja ceremony on 4October 2011.

Illness and death
During the COVID-19 pandemic, on 10 August 2020, Mukherjee announced on Twitter that he had tested positive for COVID-19 prior to a surgery to remove a blood clot in his brain. He was admitted to the hospital after accidentally slipping and falling in his bathroom. He was on ventilator support and in critical condition at the Army's Research and Referral (R&R) hospital in Delhi.

On 13 August, the hospital reported that Mukherjee was in a deep coma after he underwent brain surgery; however, his vital parameters remained stable. On 19 August, the R&R said that Mukherjee's health condition had declined as he had developed a lung infection. On , his renal parameters became "slightly deranged", with the condition worsening days later.

Mukherjee died on 31 August 2020, aged 84, which was confirmed by his son Abhijit Mukherjee via Twitter. His death came after the attending hospital confirmed that his health had deteriorated early that day, stating that he had been in septic shock since a day earlier, which was caused by his lung infection.

Condolences poured in immediately from citizens and political parties of both India and other nations. India's Prime Minister Narendra Modi, the President Ram Nath Kovind, Vice President Venkaiah Naidu, Home Minister Amit Shah, and Congress leader Rahul Gandhi conveyed their condolences via Twitter. The President of Russia, Vladimir Putin, the President of Afghanistan, Ashraf Ghani, the President of the Maldives, Ibrahim Mohamed Solih, the Prime Minister of Bangladesh, Sheikh Hasina, the Prime Minister of Bhutan, Lotay Tshering, the Prime Minister of Sri Lanka, Mahinda Rajapaksa, and the Prime Minister of Nepal, K. P. Sharma Oli, were among foreign leaders who paid their respects. Sports players and actors from the country also voiced their sorrow.

The Government of India announced a seven-day period of state mourning between 31 August to 6 September, whereby the national flag would fly at half mast on all buildings wherever it is flown regularly. The West Bengal state government declared a closure of state-run offices for the following day as a mark of respect.

Mukherjee's funeral was held the following day, on 1 September at the Lodhi Road crematorium, with full state honours. His body was brought to the crematorium in a van instead of gun carriage due to COVID-19 pandemic restrictions in the country. His ashes were immersed into the Ganges river in Haridwar.

In popular culture 
Mukherjee appeared in the Indian mock court television talk show Aap Ki Adalat on India TV when he was the Minister of Defence, discussing the UPA government's performance of in the past one year since the 2004 elections.

Honours

National
:
Bharat Ratna (2019)
Padma Vibhushan (2008)

Overseas
:
Recipient of the Bangladesh Liberation War Honour (5 March 2013)
:
Grand Cross of the National Order of the Ivory Coast (14 June 2016)
:
Grand Collar of the Order of Makarios III (28 April 2017)

Academic
 Hon. Doctor of Letters degree by the University of Wolverhampton, UK in 2011.
 Hon. D.Litt by Assam University in March 2012.
 Hon. Doctorate in Science by Visvesvaraya Technological University; Belgaum, Karnataka in 2012
 Hon. LL.D. by President of Bangladesh and Chancellor Md. Zillur Rahman at the University of Dhaka on 4March 2013.
 DCL (Doctor of Civil Law) (honoris causa) by the University of Mauritius on 13 March 2013.
 Hon. Doctorate by Istanbul University on 5 October 2013.
 Honorary Doctorate from the University of Calcutta in on 28 November 2014.
 Hon. Doctorate in Political Science by the University of Jordan on 11 October 2015.
 Hon. Doctorate by Al-Quds University of Ramallah, Palestine on 13 October 2015.
 Hon. Doctorate by Hebrew University of Jerusalem, Israel on 15 October 2015.
 Hon. Doctorate by Kathmandu University, Nepal on 3 November 2016.
 Hon. Doctorate by Goa University on 25 April 2017.
 D.Litt. (Honoris Causa) by Jadavpur University on 24 December 2017.
 Hon. D.Litt by the University of Chittagong on 16 January 2018.

Other recognition

 Best Finance Minister in the World (1984), according to Euromoney magazine survey.
 Finance Minister of the Year for Asia (2010), by Emerging Markets, daily newspaper of record for the World Bank and IMF.
 Finance Minister of the Year (2010), by The Banker
 Honorary Citizenship of Abidjan, Ivory Coast, on 15 June 2016.

Offices held
Pranab Mukherjee's positions in chronological order:
 Union Minister of Industrial Development: 1973–1974
 Union Minister of Shipping and Transport: 1974
 Minister of State for Finance: 1974–1975
 Union Minister of Revenue and Banking: 1975–1977
 Treasurer of Congress Party: 1978–79
 Treasurer of All India Congress Committee: 1978–79
 Leader of House of Rajya Sabha: 1980–85
 Union Minister of Commerce and Steel and Mines: 1980–1982
 Union Minister of Finance: 1982–1984
 Board of Governors of International Monetary Fund: 1982–1985
 Board of Governors of World Bank: 1982–1985
 Board of Governors of Asian Development Bank: 1982–1984
 Board of Governors of African Development Bank: 1982–1985
 Union Minister of Commerce and Supply: 1984
 Chairman: Campaign Committee of Congress-I for conducting National Elections to Parliament, 1984 Indian general election, 1991 Indian general election, 1996 Indian general election, 1998 Indian general election
 Chairman of Group of 24 (a Ministerial Group attached to IMF and World Bank): 1984, 2009–2012
 President of State Unit of Congress Party: 1985, 2000–08
 Chairman of Economic Advisory Cell of AICC: 1987–1989
 Deputy Chairman of Planning Commission: 1991–1996
 Union Minister of Commerce: 1993–1995
 Union Minister of External Affairs: 1995–1996
 President, SAARC Council of Ministers Conference: 1995
 General Secretary of AICC: 1998–1999
 Chairman of Central Election Coordination Committee: 1999–2012
 Leader of House of Lok Sabha: 2004–2012
 Union Minister of Defence: 2004–2006
 Union Minister of External Affairs: 2006–2009
 Union Minister of Finance: 2009–2012
 President of India: 25 July 2012 – 25 July 2017.

Books written

See also

 President of India
 List of presidents of India

References

External links

 Pranab Mukherjee (Official website)
 Pranab Mukherjee (Memorial website)
 
 

1935 births
Indian political scientists
20th-century Indian economists
20th-century Indian historians
21st-century Indian economists
21st-century Indian historians
India MPs 2004–2009
India MPs 2009–2014
Bengali Hindus
Candidates for President of India
Indian autobiographers
Indian National Congress politicians from West Bengal
Indian political party founders
Indian political writers
International Monetary Fund people
Leaders of the Lok Sabha
Lok Sabha members from West Bengal
Members of the Planning Commission of India
People from Birbhum district
People from Kolkata
Presidents of India
Rajya Sabha members from West Bengal
Recipients of the Padma Vibhushan in public affairs
University of Calcutta alumni
Academic staff of the University of Calcutta
World Bank people
Writers from West Bengal
People from Murshidabad district
20th-century Indian non-fiction writers
21st-century Indian non-fiction writers
Indian officials of the United Nations
Recipients of the Bharat Ratna
Ministers for External Affairs of India
Defence Ministers of India
Finance Ministers of India
Ministers for Corporate Affairs
Commerce and Industry Ministers of India
2020 deaths
Bangla Congress politicians
Deaths from the COVID-19 pandemic in India
21st-century Indian politicians